The Ier is a river in Romania and Hungary.

Ier may also refer to:

 Ier, the Romanian name for the river Száraz-ér in Romania and Hungary

The acronym IER may refer to:

 Instance équité et réconciliation, a Moroccan human rights commission
 Institute of Education and Research
 International Economic Review, an economics journal
 Interurban Electric Railway, a division of the Southern Pacific Railroad in the U.S.
 Institute for Energy Research, a nonprofit public policy think tank
 New South Wales Institute for Educational Research, an Australian educational research institute
 Individual Electoral Registration, a reform of electoral registration in the United Kingdom proposed by the Coalition Government
 IER (company), a subsidiary of the Bollore group which owns Source London and electric car charging infrastructure